USS Hornbill may refer to the following ships of the United States Navy:

 , formerly J. A. Martinolich, was launched in 1938 by Martinolich Repair Basin, Tacoma, Washington
 , launched as YMS-371, 27 November 1943 by Weaver Shipyards, Orange, Texas

United States Navy ship names